The March 2021 massacre in Wukro was a mass extrajudicial killing that took place in Wukro in the Tigray Region of Ethiopia during the Tigray War, on 14 March 2021. Wukro is a mid-sized town, capital of woreda Kilte Awulaelo, Eastern zone of Tigray.

Massacre
The Ethiopian National Defense Force (ENDF) killed 5 civilians in Wukro (Eastern Tigray) on 14 March 2021., as part of a series of killings in this martyr town.
According to EEPA, 5 civilians were shot, killing 3 of them. According to the neighbours, these killings were a retaliation for recent attacks by Tigray regional forces. Typical massacres committed by Ethiopian and Eritrean soldiers in the Tigray war are (1) revenge when they lose a battle; (2) to terrorise and extract information about whereabouts of TPLF leaders; (3) murder of suspected family members of TDF fighters and (4) terrorising the Tigray society as a whole such as in case of mass killings in churches. Here, the first type of massacre applies.
The EHRC–OHCHR Tigray investigation reported the massacres in this locality, without going into further detail.

Perpetrators
Relatives and neighbours interpreted the identity of the perpetrators as Ethiopian soldiers.

Victims
The “Tigray: Atlas of the humanitarian situation” mentions a total of 5 civilians killed. Many victims have been identified, but, as Wukro is a martyr town, affected by every phase of the Tigray war, the specific event in which victims died is not known yet.

Reactions
The series of massacres in Wukro received international attention in media articles. The “Tigray: Atlas of the humanitarian situation”, that documented this massacre received international media attention, particularly with regard its Annex A, that lists the massacres.

See also
 Bombing of Wukro
 Wukro massacre (November 2020)
 Wukro massacre (December 2020)
 Wukro massacre (February 2021)

References

External links
World Peace Foundation: Starving Tigray

Massacres in 2021
2021 massacres of the Tigray War
March 2021 crimes in Africa